Cuscohygrine is a pyrrolidine alkaloid found in coca. It can also be extracted from plants of the family Solanaceae, including Atropa belladonna (deadly nightshade), Datura innoxia and Datura stramonium (jimson weed). Cuscohygrine usually occurs along with other, more potent alkaloids such as atropine or cocaine.

Cuscohygrine, along with the related metabolite hygrine, was first isolated by Carl Liebermann in 1889 as an alkaloid accompanying cocaine in coca leaves (also known as Cusco-leaves).

Cuscohygrine is an oil that can be distilled without decomposition only in vacuum. It is soluble in water. It also forms a crystalline trihydrate which melts at 40–41 °C.

See also 
 Coca alkaloids
 Dihydrocuscohygrine

References 

 
 

Pyrrolidine alkaloids
Alkaloids found in Erythroxylum coca
Alkaloids found in Solanaceae
Ketones